Tuzandeh Jan-e Now (also Romanized as Tūzandeh Jān-e Now) is a village in Taghenkoh-e Shomali Rural District, Taghenkoh District, Firuzeh County, Razavi Khorasan Province, Iran. At the 2006 census, its population was 147, in 42 families.

References 

Populated places in Firuzeh County